The Congress of Cúcuta was a constituent assembly where the Republic of Colombia (historiographically called Gran Colombia because it covered the territories of the previous viceroyalty of Nueva Granada and Venezuela, which are several nations today) was created. The Congress elected Simón Bolívar and Francisco de Paula Santander president and vice-president, respectively.

The fundamental creation of the Congress was the Constitution of Cúcuta.

Creation and achievements of the Congress
Cúcuta was the birthplace of Simón Bolívar's dream of uniting South America in one single federal state, and of the principles upon which the political institutions of South America would replace those inherited from the 300 years of Spanish colonial history.

Prior to 1819, Simón Bolívar, as well as others who facilitated the revolutionary establishment of the Venezuelan Republic, referred to all of South America as Colombia. Since then, Bolívar had proposed the union of what is today Venezuela, Colombia and Ecuador in a nation by the same name. Since Bolívar based the borders of the proposed nation on the principle of uti possidetis, Panama and Ecuador were included, despite having no representation at this Congress or the one in Angostura, since they had been part of the old Viceroyalty of New Granada. At the Congress of Angostura in 1819 the word "Colombia" was, therefore, used  to describe this new country, when it was proposed. The cities of Bogotá, Caracas, and Quito were designated regional capitals within the new nation. Most of the territory of this Gran Colombia, with the exceptions of southern Colombia and Ecuador, was largely independent from Spain at the time the Congress of Cúcuta began holding sessions.

Places that were related to the Congress of Cúcuta, together with the House of Santander (Casa de Santander), are now protected due to historic significance, and form part of the Park of the Great Colombia.

Bolívar's appearance before the Congress

The culminating event of the Congress of Cúcuta took place on August 30, 1821, in the city of Cúcuta. A constitution had been written which established the law of the Republic of Colombia (Gran Colombia), and determined the country's capital and political boundaries. The convention, organized by Antonio Nariño and led by Simón Bolívar.

At 11 o'clock on the morning of October 3, 1821 Simón Bolívar entered the debating chamber of the Congress of Cúcuta, located at the time in the sacristy of the parish church of the town of Villa del Rosario de Cúcuta (the old name for the town). He was accompanied by a commission of deputies and the members of the joint chiefs of staff of his armed forces. He sat beside the speaker of the assembly and, whilst the entire assembly stood, was sworn in as the President of the nascent Republic of Colombia, composed of Venezuela and Cundinamarca, the republican name by which New Granada was by then known. After a speech, and the naming of Santander as Vice-President, the text of the Constitution of the new republic was read out.

Documents

Bolivar's speech 
Sir:

The oath I have just taken in my capacity as President of Colombia represents for me an act of conscience, which further places me under the obligation to submit to the laws of my country. Only a profound sense of respect for the will of the people could compel me to submit to the onerous position of Supreme Magistrate.  The gratitude for so doing which I feel emanates from the representatives of the people, moreover, imposes upon me the pleasant duty, to continue in the service of my country, to defend, with my possessions, my blood and my honour, this Constitution, which cements the Rights of Man, joining them in the cause of freedom, the public good, and glory. The Constitution of Colombia, together with her independence, will constitute the Holy Altar on which I shall make the necessary sacrifices. For her I will march to the very edge of Colombia to break the chains which bind the sons of Ecuador, and, making them free, invite them to join her.

Sir, I hope that you will authorize me to join together, in beneficence, those peoples which nature and Heaven have made our brothers. Once this work, born of our wisdom and my zeal, is done, nothing will remain for us to achieve but peace, so that we may give to Colombia its rest and its glory. Therefore, Sir, I preach you ardently, do not show yourself deaf to the call of my conscience and my honour, which bid me loudly to remain solely a citizen. I feel the necessity of quitting the Presidency of the Republic, which the people hold as the Master of their Hearts. I am the son of war; a man brought to power only by dint of combat; fortune has kept for me this rank and victory has confirmed me in it. But these are not the titles consecrated by justice, good fortune, and the will of the people. The sword which has governed Colombia is not the scales of justice, but the whip of misfortune which, sometimes, Heaven lets fall to Earth to punish tyrants and boastful nations. That sword serves no purpose when there is peace, and this should be the last time I am permitted to wield it; so I have sworn to myself, because I have promised it to Colombia, and because there can be no Republic where the people cannot wield power. A man such as myself, is a dangerous thing in a popular government; my existence is a clear and present danger to the sovereignty of the nation. I would wish to be a citizen, a free man, so that all may be free men. I prefer the name of Citizen to that of Liberator, for the latter being born of war, the former is born of law. I beseech thee, Sir, I should give up all my titles, if in exchange I could procure but one: that of The Good Citizen.

Fundamental law establishing Gran Colombia (Congress of Angostura)
"The Sovereign Congress of Venezuela, to which authority the people of the Republic of the New Granada have voluntarily stood by.

"Considering:

"That united in a single Republic, the provinces of Venezuela and the New Granada have all proportions and ways to elevate themselves to a higher grade of power and prosperity.
"That constituted in separate republics, for more stronger the ties that these have united them, so far from taking advantages of so many advantages, they would hardly consolidate and make respect their sovereignty.
"That these truths, highly penetrated by superior talented men and of an enlightened patriotism, had moved the governments of both republics to convene in a reunion that the vicissitudes of wars decreed and decree the following fundamental Law of the Republic of Colombia:

"ARTICLE 1. The Republics of Venezuela and New Granada are from this day on united in a single one under the glorious title of Republic of Colombia.

"ARTICLE 2. Their territory will be the one that the Former General Capitancies of Venezuela and the Viceroyalty of New Granada covering a total area of 115 thousand square leagues, which in better circumstances will be defined precisely.

"ARTICLE 3. Debts acquired by both republics will be recognized in solidum by this law as a National debt of Colombia to which payment will be attached all goods and properties of the nation, and the most productive branches of the public rent will also be destined to pay these.

"ARTICLE 4. The Executive Power of the Republic will be vested on the President and in case of his defect a Vice President and his replacement will be appointed interimly by the acting Congress.

"ARTICLE 5. The Republic of Colombia will be divided into three great departments, Venezuela, Quito and Cundinamarca, that will contain the Provinces of New Granada which name will be suppressed from now on. The capitals of these departments will be the cities of Caracas, Quito and Bogotá, this last one without the name addition of Santa Fe.

"ARTICLE 6. Each department will have a superior administration and a chief, appointed, for now by this congress, with the title of Vice President.

"ARTICLE 7. A new city which will be named after El Libertador Simon Bolivar will be the capital of the Republic of Colombia. Its plan and situation will be determined by the First General Congress under the principle of proportioning it with the necessities of the three departments, and the greatness of these large country is destined by nature.

"ARTICLE 8. The General Congress of Colombia will meet on January 1, 1821 in Villa del Rosario de Cúcuta which is central to the country and will facilitate the reunion. its convocation will be done by the President on January 1, 1820 in accordance with a previously regulated memos that will be formulated by a Special Commission and under the approval of the current Congress.

"ARTICLE 9. The constitution of the Republic of Colombia will be formulated by its General Congress, which will be presented as a draft project, and its laws will later be tested in execution.

"ARTICLE 10. The Arms and the Colombian flag will be decreed by the General Congress and will use the Arms and Flag of Venezuela because it is more known.

"ARTICLE 11. The current Congress will go on recess on January 15, 1820 due to new elections for the General Congress of Colombia.

"ARTICLE 12. A commission of six members and a President will temporarily replace Congress and with special attributions that will be determined by a decree.

ARTICLE 13. The Republic of Colombia will be solemnly proclaimed in towns and armies, with parties and public demonstrations, which will be verified in this capital on the 25th day of this present December in celebration of the birthday of the World's saviour, that under his sponsoring we have achieved this wished reunion and in which the state has regenerated.

"ARTICLE 14. The anniversary of this political regeneration will be celebrated perpetually with a national feast in which there will be awarded, just like in Olympia, the virtuous and the enlightened.

"The present fundamental law of the Republic of Colombia is solemnly proclaimed only in towns and armies, registered in all public registries and saved in every municipal cabildos and corporations, ecclesiastic or secular.

"Given in the sovereign Palace of the Congress of Venezuela in the City of Santo Tomás de Angostura, ten days before the month of December, in the lords' year of eighteen nineteen.  Ninth of the Independence.

"The President of Congress, Francisco Antonio Zea; Juan Germán Roscio; Manuel Sedeño; Juan Martínez; José España; Luis Tomás Peraza; Antonio M. Briceño; Eusebio Afanador; Francisco Conde; Diego Bautista Urbaneja; Juan Vicente Cardozo; Ignacio Muñoz; Ramón García Cádiz. The Deputy Secretary, Diego de Vallenilla.

"Palace of the Sovereign Congress of Venezuela in Angostura, December 17, 1819 –9th [year of independence].

"The sovereign Congress decrees that this fundamental law of the Republic of Colombia must be informed to the Executive Supreme Power by means of a delegation for its approval and then published and accomplished.

"The President of Congress, Francisco Antonio Zea. The deputy secretary, Diego de Vallenilla. Palace of the Sovereign Congress of Venezuela in Angostura, December 17, 1819 –9th. Print it, Publish it, execute and Authorize with the Seal of the State.

"Simón Bolívar

"For his Excellency the President of the Republic, the minister of Interior and Justice,
"Diego B. Urbaneja."

See also 

 House of Santander
 Historic church of Cúcuta
 Park of Gran Colombia
 Cúcuta
 Villa del Rosario
 1875 Cúcuta earthquake

Bibliography
Bushnell, David (1970). The Santander Regime in Gran Colombia. Westport: Greenwood Press. 
Gibson, William Marion (1948). The Constitutions of Colombia. Durham: Duke University Press.

Gran Colombia
Independence of Colombia
Independence of Venezuela
Constituent assemblies
Cúcuta
Simón Bolívar
Francisco de Paula Santander
1821 in Gran Colombia
1821 in Colombia
1821 in Venezuela